The 1861 Alabama gubernatorial election took place on August 5, 1861 in order to elect the governor of Alabama. Democrat John Gill Shorter won his first term as governor.

Candidates

Democratic Party 

 John Gill Shorter, Deputy from Alabama to the Provisional Congress of the Confederate States

Whig Party 

 Thomas H. Watts, 3rd Confederate States Attorney General

Election

Statewide

References

Alabama gubernatorial elections
Alabama